Pa Ar may refer to:
Pa Ar, a village in Ke Chong commune, Bar Kaev district, Cambodia
Pa Ar, a village in Pate commune, Ou Ya Dav district, Cambodia